Keswick is a village and former civil parish, now in the parish of Keswick and Intwood, in the South Norfolk district, in the county of Norfolk, England. It should not be mistaken for the coastal settlement of Keswick, near Bacton, which is also in Norfolk.

The church of Keswick All Saints is one of 124 existing round-tower churches in Norfolk. There was a small early church here, but it was demolished c 1598 to use the materials to repair Intwood’s round-tower church, when the two parishes were consolidated. The original east wall of the chancel still stands to the east of the existing church, and part of the tower could also be Saxon, although it was much repaired in 1893. At that time the short nave was added to the tower to make a mortuary chapel. In 1934 church services were authorised, but the apse was not added until some decades later.

Keswick Hall near All Saints was the representative manor and country house that served as a residence of the Gurney family. Between 1948 and 1981 it accommodated a teacher training college (which was then incorporated into the University of East Anglia) prior to being converted into apartments. Several members of the Gurneys of Keswick are buried in the churchyard of All Saints.

Former professional footballer Darren Huckerby lives in the village.

Civil parish 
On 1 April 1935 the parish of Intwood was merged with Keswick, on 7 July 2007 the parish was renamed "Keswick & Intwood". In 1931 the parish of Keswick (prior to the merge) had a population of 127.

Gallery

References

  Ordnance Survey (1999). OS Explorer Map 237 - Norwich. .
  Office for National Statistics & Norfolk County Council (2001). Census population and household counts for unparished urban areas and all parishes. Retrieved 2 December 2005.
  The Round Tower Churches of Norfolk by Lyn Stilgoe, illustrated by Dorothy Shreeve, 2001, Canterbury Press, Norwich;

External links

All Saints on the European Round Tower Churches Website
Information from Genuki Norfolk on Keswick
Website with photos of Keswick All Saints and its interior
Website dedicated to the former teacher training college at Keswick Hall

 
Villages in Norfolk
Former civil parishes in Norfolk
South Norfolk